Chongyang may refer to:

 Chongyang Festival (重阳节) or Double Ninth Festival, a Chinese traditional festival
 Chongyang County (崇阳县), of Xianning Hubei, China
 Chongyang, Shaoguan (重阳镇), a town in Wujiang District, Shaoguan, Guangdong China
 Chongyang, Xixia County (重阳镇), a town in Xixia County, Henan, China
 Wang Chongyang (1113–1170), Chinese Taoist in the Song Dynasty

See also
 Zhongyang (disambiguation)